Vice Admiral Ajit Kumar PVSM, AVSM, VSM, ADC is a retired Indian Navy Admiral. He served as Flag Officer Commanding-in-Chief (FOC-in-C) Western Naval Command. He assumed the position on 31 January 2019 after Vice Admiral Girish Luthra's retirement and superannuated on 28 February 2021.  Prior to this appointment, he served as Vice Chief of Naval Staff.

Early life and education 
He is an alumnus of Sainik School, Kazhakootam, Kerala and National Defence Academy, Pune. He has also attended the Naval Higher Command Course and the Naval War College, Newport (2004).

Career 
He was commissioned in the navy on 1 July 1981. He is a missile and gunnery specialist. He has commanded six ships including INS Kulish; INS Talwar; INS Mumbai  and INS Mysore. He was deputed to the Mauritian Coast Guard on his first assignment where, over two and a half years, he commanded two patrol vessels. His staff assignments include Director Maritime Warfare Centre, Visakhapatnam; Commanding Officer of INS Dronacharya; Chief Staff Officer (Operations) of the Western Naval Command.

In September 2009, he was promoted to flag rank as a Rear Admiral. Subsequently, his assignments included Assistant Chief of Personnel (Human Resources Development) at IHQ of MoD; Flag Officer Commanding Eastern Fleet (FOCEF) and Chief of Staff of Southern Naval Command. He was promoted to the rank of Vice Admiral on 1 December 2013. As a Vice Admiral, he has served as the Commandant of Indian Naval Academy (December 2013 to February 2016). During his tenure as the commandant, there was expansion of the academy and different naval schools across the country were shifted to the main campus at Ezhimala. He has also served as the Deputy Chief of Integrated Defence Staff (Operations) and as Deputy Chief of Integrated Defence Staff (Policy Planning & Force Development) at the HQ of MoD. 

He was appointed as Vice Chief of Naval Staff on 30 October 2017, succeeding Vice Admiral Karambir Singh.

During his career, he has been awarded Param Vishisht Seva Medal, Ati Vishisht Seva Medal, Vishisht Seva Medal for his service.

Awards and decorations

Personal life 
He and his wife Sunita Kumar have a daughter. He is interested in reading and yoga.

References

 

Sainik School alumni
Living people
Year of birth missing (living people)
Vice Chiefs of Naval Staff (India)
Flag Officers Commanding Eastern Fleet
Indian Navy admirals
National Defence Academy (India) alumni
Commandants of the Indian Naval Academy
Naval War College alumni
Recipients of the Param Vishisht Seva Medal
Recipients of the Ati Vishisht Seva Medal
Recipients of the Vishisht Seva Medal